Borki  is a village in the administrative district of Gmina Szczucin, within Dąbrowa County, Lesser Poland Voivodeship, in southern Poland.

Before Polish administrative reorganization in 1999 Borki village was part of Tarnów Voivodeship (1975–1998).

The village has a population of 850.

References

Borki